Andrea Echeverri is the self-titled debut studio album by Colombian musician Andrea Echeverri released on February 8, 2005 by Nacional Records . It received a nomination for a Grammy Award for Best Latin Pop Album.

Track listing

Personnel 
Credits for Andrea Echeverri adapted from Allmusic.

Musicians 
Andrea Echeverri  – Guitar, Accordion, Marimba, Vocals, Graphic Design, Photography, Frog, Bagpipes, Strings, Clapping	
Héctor Buitrago  – Guitar, Keyboards, Programming, Producer, Sixth Bass, Clapping
Andrés Alvarez  – Keyboards
Roberto Cuao  – Percussion
Alejandro Gomez  – Strings
Rodrígo Mancera  – Guitar
Gabriel Rondon  – Guitar
Nadine Vasquez - Guitar

Production
Richard Blair  – Producer
Rodrigo Facundo  – Graphic Design, Photography
Andrés Landínez  – Assistant Engineer
Felipe López  – Engineer
Jose Manuel  – Producer
Thom Russo  – Programming, Production Assistant, Mixturer
Eddy Schreyer  – Mastering

References

2005 debut albums
Andrea Echeverri albums